Thierry Catherine (born 2 August 1997) is a Martiniquais professional footballer who plays for Golden Lion FC and the Martinique national football team.

Career statistics

International

References

External links
 
 Thierry Catherine at Caribbean Football Database

1997 births
Living people
Association football midfielders
Martiniquais footballers
Martiniquais expatriate footballers
Martinique international footballers
Expatriate soccer players in the United States
Martiniquais expatriate sportspeople in the United States